Li Xiaolu (born 30 September 1982), also known as Jacqueline Li, is a Chinese actress and singer. She is best known for her role in Joan Chen's directing debut Xiu Xiu: The Sent Down Girl (1998), idol drama All the Misfortunes Caused by the Angel (2001) and the popular youth series Struggle (2007). At age 16, she was the youngest actress to win the Golden Horse Award for Best Leading Actress.

Early life
Li was born into a literary family. Her grandfather was a worker at the August First Film Studios; and both her parents were actors. She first appeared in a television series at the age of 3.

Career
Li first rose to fame with the 1998 movie Xiu Xiu: The Sent Down Girl, which won her Best Actress awards at the Golden Horse Awards, Paris Film Festival and the Deauville Asian Film Festival. At age 17, she was the youngest actress to win the Golden Horse Awards for Best Actress. She laid low for the next two years, but in 2001, was thrust back into the limelight with her role in the popular idol drama All the Misfortunes Caused by the Angel (2001).

In 2005, Li won the Best Actress award at the Romania International Film Festival for her performance in the Sino-Japanese film About Love.

In 2007, she co-starred in the youth series Struggle. Based on the popular novel by Shi Kang, Struggle gained unexpected acclaim and was seen as a breakthrough in Chinese TV production as it broke from the usual Chinese TV series focusing in traditional legends and series. Her role as the bratty and adorable Yang Xiaoyun was a hit with the audience and propelled her to a household name in China. Due to her popularity, Li was crowned the "Golden Eagle Goddess" at the China Golden Eagle TV Art Festival, where she performed as the opening act to the ceremony.

In 2011, Li starred in the ancient fantasy series Beauty World (2011), her first period drama in six years.

Li's subsequent roles in the family dramas My Mom and My Mother-in-Law (2011), AA Lifestyle (2012) and We Love You, Mr. Jin (2012) cemented her image as the "Nation's Daughter-in-Law" in China.
She won the Best Actress at the Huading Awards for her role in My Mom and My Mother-in-Law.

In 2013, Li starred in comedy film Personal Tailor directed by Feng Xiaogang, playing multiple roles in the film. Personal Tailor was one of the highest grossing films of the year.

Personal life
Li married actor Jia Nailiang in 2012. The same year, she gave birth to their daughter, Jelena. In October 2019, Li was revealed to have extramarital affairs and shot three intimate videos with rapper PG One, who was revealed to have been her lover in 2017. Li and Jia divorced on 14 November 2019.

Filmography

Film

Television series

Discography

Albums

Singles

Awards and nominations

References

External links

1982 births
Living people
20th-century Chinese actresses
21st-century Chinese actresses
Chinese film actresses
Chinese television actresses
Chinese Mandopop singers
Actresses from Anhui
Actresses from Beijing
Singers from Anhui
People from Anqing
Chinese child actresses
21st-century Chinese women singers